Christ the King High School is a secondary school located on Old Parham Road in St. John's, Antigua and Barbuda. It is the only all-girls Catholic high school located on the island of Antigua however in the past it was once a co-ed school. Its brother school is St. Joseph's Academy. If the child is not of age to go to the School there is a school for children named St.John's Catholic and a pre-school named Early Childhood Pre-school.

Notable alumni 

 Ashley Boodhoo, Miss Antigua and Barbuda 2018
 George-Ann Ryan, Chief Financial Officer of The Sadie Collective and Chief Operating Officer at Ryan Group of Companies

See also
List of schools in Antigua and Barbuda

Girls' schools in Antigua and Barbuda
Buildings and structures in St. John's, Antigua and Barbuda
Catholic secondary schools in Antigua and Barbuda
Educational institutions established in 1933